Bernard Yipeng Sun (born 3 February 1999) is a Chinese footballer who plays as a midfielder, most recently for English club Birmingham City.

Club career
Born in Shanghai, Sun moved to Koblenz, Germany, at the age of seven and represented FC Kaiserslautern, TuS Koblenz, JFV Rhein-Hunstrück and Sportfreunde Eisbachtal as a youth. In 2017, after finishing his development, he moved to Spain after agreeing a contract with FC Jumilla and being assigned to their reserves, Estudiantes de Murcia CF of the Tercera División.

Sun made his senior debut on 24 September 2017, starting in a 3–1 away win against CD Minera. He scored his first goal the following 3 March, netting his team's third in a 5–3 success at CD Bala Azul.

On 30 January 2019, Sun was loaned to Segunda División side Gimnàstic de Tarragona until June, and was initially assigned to their farm team, CF Pobla de Mafumet, also a fourth-tier club. He made his professional debut on 26 May, coming on as a late substitute for Pol Prats in a 3–3 home draw with Elche CF in the Segunda División.

On 2 September 2019, Sun joined Birmingham City on a two-year deal. He made no first-team appearances, and in May 2021, Birmingham confirmed that he would leave the club when his contract expired at the end of the season.

References

External links
Gimnàstic profile 

1999 births
Living people
Footballers from Shanghai
Chinese footballers
German footballers
Association football midfielders
Segunda División players
Tercera División players
Gimnàstic de Tarragona footballers
Birmingham City F.C. players
China youth international footballers
Chinese expatriate footballers
Chinese expatriate sportspeople in Spain
Chinese expatriate sportspeople in England
Expatriate footballers in Spain
Expatriate footballers in England